This article contains an overview of the year 2009 in athletics.

The major competition of the year was the 2009 World Championships in Athletics. At the event, Usain Bolt reaffirmed himself as one of the world's foremost athletes with world records in the 100 and 200 metres. Caster Semenya won 800 m gold at the championships, but a request that she submit to a gender verification test was made public, sparking widespread controversy and debate. Yelena Isinbayeva, a clear favourite, finished last in the pole vault competition, but rebounded with a world record a week later.

Kenenisa Bekele, Sanya Richards and Isinbayeva were the winners of the last IAAF Golden League jackpot, as the series was replaced by the IAAF Diamond League in 2010.

Major events

World

World Championships in Athletics
World Half Marathon Championships
World Cross Country Championships
World Athletics Final
World Youth Championships
Golden League
World Student Games

Regional

African Junior Championships
CAC Championships
South American Championships
Pan American Junior Championships
Jeux de la Francophonie
Lusophony Games
European Team Championships
European Indoor Championships
European Junior Championships
European U23 Championships
European Cross Country Championships
European Mountain Running Championships
European Race Walking Cup
Mediterranean Games
Asian Championships
Asian Indoor Games
East Asian Games
Southeast Asian Games
Asian Youth Games
Maccabiah Games

National

China National Games
German Championships
Finnish Championships
Lithuanian Championships
USA Outdoor Championships

World records

Men

Women

Season's bests

Awards

Men

Women

Doping
Incidents of athletes testing positive for banned substances were low-key compared to previous years. The IAAF conducted their largest ever anti-doping program at the 2009 World Championships in Athletics, and Jamel Chatbi and Nigerian hurdler Amaka Ogoegbunam were the only athletes who tested positive. Five Jamaican sprint athletes, including Yohan Blake and Sheri-Ann Brooks, tested positive for Methylhexanamine prior to the world championships. Four of the athletes received three-month bans, while Brooks was cleared on a technicality.

A Brazilian coach, Jayme Netto, admitted that he had administered the banned drug recombinant EPO on five of his athletes without their knowledge. South American champion Lucimar Teodoro was another high-profile Brazilian athlete to be banned.

Retirements
Kim Collins, 100 m gold medallist at the 2003 World Championships. (returned to competition in 2010)
Stacy Dragila, Olympic gold medallist, two-time World Champion, and former world record holder in the pole vault.
Yulia Pechonkina, 2005 World Champion in the 400 m hurdles, and current world record holder.

Deaths
February 18 — Kamila Skolimowska (26), Polish hammer thrower (born 1982)
April 6 — Svetlana Ulmasova (56), Uzbekistani long-distance runner (born 1953)
May 8 — Fons Brydenbach (54), Belgian sprinter  (born 1954)
June 27 — Nanae Nagata (53), Japanese long-distance runner (born 1956)
October 2 — Jørgen Jensen (65), Danish long-distance runner (born 1944)
October 25 — Ingeborg Mello (90), Argentine discus thrower and shot putter (born 1919)

References

 
Athletics (track and field) by year